Kingsway is a 2018 Canadian comedy-drama film, written, produced, and directed by Bruce Sweeney. The film stars Gabrielle Rose as Marion Horvat, a woman whose adult son Matt (Jeff Gladstone) has recently attempted suicide after breaking up with his wife. The film also stars Camille Sullivan as Marion's daughter and Matt's sister Jess, Agam Darshi as Jess's girlfriend Megan, and Colleen Rennison as Matt's ex-wife Lori.

The film premiered at the 2018 Toronto International Film Festival.

Rose received a Vancouver Film Critics Circle Award nomination for Best Supporting Actress in a Canadian Film at the Vancouver Film Critics Circle Awards 2018.

References

External links

2018 films
2018 comedy-drama films
Canadian comedy-drama films
English-language Canadian films
Films directed by Bruce Sweeney
Canadian LGBT-related films
LGBT-related comedy-drama films
2018 LGBT-related films
2010s English-language films
2010s Canadian films